The Beaufort Sisters is a 1979 novel written by Australian author Jon Cleary about four wealthy sisters from Kansas. Kerry Packer wanted to have it adapted into a mini series but although scripts were written no show resulted.

References

External links
The Beaufort Sisters at AustLit (subscription required)

1979 Australian novels
Novels set in Kansas
William Collins, Sons books
William Morrow and Company books
Novels by Jon Cleary